Eugene Vincent Murphy (August 6, 1939 – October 29, 2011) was an American football player and coach. He served as the head football coach at the University of North Dakota from 1978 to 1979 and at California State University, Fullerton from 1980 to 1992, compiling a career college football coaching record 74–96–1.

Early years
Born and raised in New Brunswick, New Jersey, Murphy's father was a football coach. He was an all-state quarterback and shortstop in high school.  He initially attended the University of Minnesota, then transferred to the University of North Dakota in Grand Forks, and played college football as a quarterback for the UND Fighting Sioux from 1960 to 1962.

Coaching
Murphy then moved into an assistant coaching position with the team, where he remained until 1977. Murphy later was the UND head coach in 1978 to 1979. The team went 15–7 in his two seasons, winning the North Central Conference and advancing to the Division II playoffs in 1979. He was succeeded at North Dakota by one of his assistants, Pat Behrns.

In 1980, Murphy became head coach at California State University, Fullerton in Orange County. He led the Titans for thirteen years and was their final coach; the program was discontinued after the 1992 season.  The Titans won the Pacific Coast Athletic Association championships in 1983 and 1984.  The 1984 team was ranked in the National Top 20 and finished 12-0.

His assistants included future National Football League (NFL) head coaches Steve Mariucci, Tom Cable, and Hue Jackson. Notable former players include Damon Allen, Mike Pringle, Bobby Kemp, Mark Collins, and James Thornton. In 1999, Murphy was inducted into both the University of North Dakota Hall of Fame, and was inducted to the Cal State Fullerton Athletics Hall of Fame in 2009.

After Cal State Fullerton dropped its football program, Murphy served as head coach at Fullerton College from 1993 to 2007. He remained a consultant with the program until his death.

Death
Murphy died at age 72 in 2011 at USC Hospital in Los Angeles, four days after surgery for esophageal cancer. He had seemed to be recuperating from the surgery when he had a heart attack. He was survived by his daughter Aileen, her mother Christine McCarthy, his two adult sons, Tim and Mike, and his four grandchildren. Murphy's funeral service was held at St. Juliana’s Catholic Church. He was buried in Fullerton at Loma Vista Memorial Park.

Head coaching record

College

References

External links
 Fullerton College – Gene Murphy
 Gene Murphy Golf Classic
 

1939 births
2011 deaths
American football quarterbacks
Cal State Fullerton Titans football coaches
North Dakota Fighting Hawks football coaches
North Dakota Fighting Hawks football players
Fullerton Hornets football coaches